"Love Me More" is a song by British singer Sam Smith, released as a single on 28 April 2022 through Capitol Records. It is included on Smith's fourth studio album, Gloria (2023). Written and produced by Smith, Mikkel S. Eriksen and Tor Hermansen of Stargate and Jimmy Napes, the song was announced on 20 April 2022.

Reception
Tomás Mier of Rolling Stone described the song as a "melancholic track" that "turns into a self-empowering anthem". Rania Aniftos of Billboard called the song "empowering" and felt that Smith's "honeyed vocals ring through the pensive chorus".

Music video
The music video was released on 28 April 2022, and includes a montage of footage of Smith as a child through to the beginning of their career, as well as Smith dancing at a party with their friends. The video also contains an homage to the video for Smith's breakthrough song "Stay with Me", with Smith walking down stairs as they did in the video for "Stay with Me".

Track listing
Digital download / streaming
 "Love Me More" – 3:10

Digital download / streaming (Acoustic)
 "Love Me More" (Acoustic) – 3:22

Charts

Weekly charts

Year-end charts

Release history

References

2022 singles
2022 songs
Capitol Records singles
Sam Smith (singer) songs
Song recordings produced by Stargate (record producers)
Songs written by Jimmy Napes
Songs written by Mikkel Storleer Eriksen
Songs written by Sam Smith (singer)
Songs written by Tor Erik Hermansen